Sawyer Run is a stream in the U.S. state of Ohio. It is a tributary to the Ohio River.

Sawyer Run was named after Nathaniel Sawyer, the proprietor of a local corn cracker mill. A variant name is "Sawyers Run".

References

Rivers of Ohio
Rivers of Athens County, Ohio
Rivers of Washington County, Ohio